Gerald Marchesi (4 December 1928 – 12 June 1990) was an Italian-Australian rules footballer who played for North Melbourne in the Victorian Football League (VFL).

A half forward flanker, Marchesi kicked 49 goals in 1953 which saw him top North Melbourne's goalkicking and finish fourth in the league. He was also chosen in the Sporting Globe's VFL team of the year for that season.

In 1954, his final season, Marchesi was club captain and led the Kangaroos into the finals.

References

External links
 

1928 births
1990 deaths
Australian rules footballers from Victoria (Australia)
North Melbourne Football Club players
Australian people of Italian descent